Andrés Molteni and Guido Pella were the defending champions, but chose not to defend their title.

Julio Peralta and Hans Podlipnik won the title defeating Facundo Bagnis and Máximo González in the final, 7–6(7–4), 4–6, [10–5].

Seeds

Draw

References
 Main Draw

Challenger ATP Cachantun Cup - Doubles
2016 - Doubles